Forbidden Forest is a 2004 Canadian documentary film directed by Kevin W. Matthews. Approximately 70 minutes long, it was co-produced by the National Film Board of Canada and Timber Colony Inc. The film follows Jean Guy Comeau, an Acadian woodlot owner and Francis Wishart, the grandson of Sir James Dunn, as they agitate for responsible forestry on New Brunswick Crown lands.

References

External links
National Film Board of Canada - Forbidden Forest.

2004 films
Canadian documentary films
Forestry in Canada
National Film Board of Canada documentaries
Documentary films about forests and trees
2000s French-language films
2004 documentary films
Forest conservation
Economy of New Brunswick
Films shot in New Brunswick
French-language Canadian films
2000s Canadian films